Life Marks is a 2003 Spanish drama film directed by Enrique Urbizu, written by Urbizu and Michel Gaztambide and starring José Coronado, Juan Sanz and Zay Nuba.

Plot
Fito and his wife Juana live in the suburbs of Madrid. He drives a truck for a living and has a gambling problem. Daily, he loses money playing poker. One day, his older brother, Pedro who had spent his last years living in London comes back to his homeland and visits Fito's family. This visit will change the life of every single member of the family.

Cast

Production 
The film was produced by Tornasol Films and Iberrota Films with the participation of TVE,  and EITB. Footage was shot in Madrid, specifically in the districts of Fuencarral-El Pardo and Barajas.

Release 
Distributed by Alta Films, the film was theatrically released on 9 May 2003.

Reception 
Reviewing for Fotogramas, Fernando Méndez-Leite rated the film with 4 out of 5 stars, considering it a "strange and evocative approach to an intimate story", highlighting the "elegant" mise-en-scène by Urbizu, the boldness of the proposal and Coronado's performance to be the best about the film.

Jonathan Holland of Variety deemed it to be a "delicately impressive, offbeat drama", writing about the "commanding, impassive presence" of Coronado's performance, contrasting with the exuding "freshness and enthusiasm" by Sanz and Nuba.

See also 
 List of Spanish films of 2003

References

External links
 

2003 films
2000s crime thriller films
Spanish thriller drama films
Films shot in Madrid
2000s Spanish films
2000s Spanish-language films
Tornasol Films films